Andrey Aguilar Komissarov (born 18 November 1960) is a Costa Rican former swimmer who competed in the 1980 Summer Olympics and in the 1984 Summer Olympics. His sister was freestyle swimmer Natasha Aguilar.

References

1960 births
Living people
Costa Rican male swimmers
Costa Rican people of Russian descent
Male butterfly swimmers
Male breaststroke swimmers
Male medley swimmers
Olympic swimmers of Costa Rica
Swimmers at the 1979 Pan American Games
Swimmers at the 1980 Summer Olympics
Swimmers at the 1983 Pan American Games
Swimmers at the 1984 Summer Olympics
Pan American Games competitors for Costa Rica
Competitors at the 1982 Central American and Caribbean Games
Central American and Caribbean Games gold medalists for Costa Rica
Central American and Caribbean Games medalists in swimming